The 2018 Oceania Youth Olympic Games Qualifier for boys' field hockey was held from the 25 to 28 April 2018 in Port Moresby, Papua New Guinea. The tournament also served as a direct qualifier for the 2018 Summer Youth Olympics, with the winner, runner-up and third placed team qualifying.

Qualified teams

Format
The four teams will each play each other two times, having played six games in total. The top two teams advance to the final, while the bottom two teams play for the third and fourth place.

Results
All times are local (UTC+10:00).

Preliminary round

Pool A

First to fourth place classification

Third and fourth place

Final

Final standings

References

Men's EuroHockey Nations Championship
2018
Port Moresby
Field hockey at the 2018 Summer Youth Olympics